Jenna Martin (born August 19, 1993, in Janesville, Wisconsin as Jenna Haag) is an American curler. Martin is a two-time United States Junior Curling Champion, in 2008 on Nina Spatola's team and in 2015 on Cory Christensen's team.

Teams

Personal life
She graduated from the University of Wisconsin-Milwaukee.

References

External links

 USA Curling profile
 Jenna Martin - Curling World Cup player profile
 Team Cory Christensen - Grand Slam of Curling (web archive; February 21, 2019)

1993 births
Living people
Sportspeople from Janesville, Wisconsin
American female curlers
University of Wisconsin–Milwaukee alumni
21st-century American women